Harley Quinn is a character appearing in comic books published by DC Comics.

Harley Quinn may also refer to:

 Harley Quinn (DC Extended Universe)
 Harley Quinn, an alternate title for Birds of Prey (2020 film), a 2020 American film based on the DC Comics team the Birds of Prey
 Harley Quinn (pornographic actress)
 Harley Quinn (TV series), an American animated television series based on the DC Comics character
 Harley Quinn Smith, daughter of Kevin Smith

See also
 Harley (disambiguation)
 Quinn (disambiguation)